The X-Roads Warriors Football Club (pronounced Crossroads Warriors) is a Bermudian football club based in Smith's Parish. The club presently competes in the Bermudian Premier Division, the top tier of football in Bermuda.

References

External links 
 

Football clubs in Bermuda
Sandys Parish